Ronnie Pascale (born September 6, 1976 in North Salem, New York) is a retired American soccer player.

Career

Youth and College
Pascale played college soccer at Furman University from 1995 to 1998. In his rookie season he was named the Southern Conference Rookie of the Year, and went on to be named to the Southern All-Conference team four times, Conference Goalkeeper of the year three times, and was twice named to the 2nd team All-South. He was also named the Furman Male Athlete of the Year in his senior year.

Professional
Pascale turned professional in 1999 when he was drafted by Atlanta Silverbacks in the second round of the 1999 A-League draft, and played two games in his rookie season as backup to first choice goalkeeper Bo Oshoniyi, before moving on to Richmond Kickers in 2000.

Pascale has been ever-present for the Kickers since then, and has been the team's first choice goalkeeper since 2002. He was the Supporter's Choice MVP in both 2003 and 2004, Player's Choice MVP in 2005, and was USL2 Goalkeeper of the Year in 2006 with a league-low goals against average of 0.99. He was also part of the Kickers team which won the USL Second Division championships in 2006 and 2009. On February 3, 2010, Richmond announced the re-signing of Pascale for the 2010 season.

Pascale re-signed with the club for the 2011 season on January 6, 2011. The club announced that 2011 would be his final season as a player. He reached the milestone of 250 league games for the Kickers on May 25, 2011, lining up between the posts in a game against Orlando City.

Richmond signed Pascale as a player and assistant coach for the 2012 season on February 13, 2012.

Pascale announced his retirement on November 15, 2012.

In 2016, Pascale briefly came back from retirement to become the backup goalkeeper for the Richmond Kickers.

Coaching
In addition to his playing career, Pascale was the goalkeeper coach at Virginia Commonwealth University from 2002 to 2007.

Honors

Richmond Kickers
USL Second Division Champions (1):   2006,2009

References

External links
Richmond Kickers bio

1976 births
Living people
American soccer players
Furman Paladins men's soccer players
Atlanta Silverbacks players
Richmond Kickers players
A-League (1995–2004) players
USL First Division players
USL Second Division players
USL Championship players
People from North Salem, New York
Association football goalkeepers